The 2015 Northern Arizona Lumberjacks football team represented Northern Arizona University in the 2015 NCAA Division I FCS football season. They were led by 18th-year head coach Jerome Souers and played their home games at the Walkup Skydome. They were a member of the Big Sky Conference. They finished the season 7–4, 5–3 in Big Sky play to finish in a four-way tie for fourth place.

Schedule

Source: Official Schedule

Game summaries

at Stephen F. Austin

New Mexico Highlands

at #20 (FBS) Arizona

at Montana

Montana State

at UC Davis

Weber State

Northern Colorado

at Eastern Washington

Sacramento State

at Southern Utah

Ranking movements

References

Northern Arizona
Northern Arizona Lumberjacks football seasons
Northern Arizona Lumberjacks football